Nancy Gillian Siraisi (born 1932) is an American historian of medicine, and distinguished professor emerita in history at Hunter College, and City University of New York.

Life
Siraisi received a B.A. (1953) and an M.A. (1958) from the University of Oxford and a Ph.D. (1970) from the City University of New York. She was a professor of history at Hunter College (1970–2003) and the Graduate Center (1976–2003) at the City University of New York.

Siraisi is a leading scholar in the history of medicine and science of the Middle Ages and the Renaissance. Her research has ranged widely across these two distinct fields, from her first book on the university curriculum in medieval Padua to her current work on the role of doctors in history-writing in the Renaissance.

Through her numerous publications and professional activities, Siraisi has contributed to the growth of the history of science and medicine while also fostering the continued close interaction of these fields with "mainstream" history, notably through her faithful teaching of general medieval and Renaissance history and her insistence on careful contextualization.

Awards and honors
1997 Elected to the American Philosophical Society
2003 George Sarton Medal
2008 MacArthur Fellows Program
2010 Charles Homer Haskins Prize Lecturer by the American Council of Learned Societies.

Works
Taddeo Alderotti and His Pupils: Two Generations of Italian Medical Learning, Books on Demand, 1981, 
The clock and the mirror: Girolamo Cardano and Renaissance medicine, Princeton University Press, 1997, 
Medicine and the Italian universities, 1250-1600, BRILL, 2001, 
History, Medicine, and the Traditions of Renaissance Learning, University of Michigan Press, 2007, 
 Communities of Learned Experience: Epistolary Medicine in the Renaissance. Johns Hopkins University Press, 2013,  
Natural particulars: nature and the disciplines in Renaissance Europe, Editors Anthony Grafton, Nancy G. Siraisi, MIT Press, 1999, 
Historia: empiricism and erudition in early modern Europe, Editors	Gianna Pomata, Nancy G. Siraisi, MIT Press, 2005,

References

1932 births
Living people
American medical historians
Alumni of the University of Oxford
Hunter College faculty
Graduate Center, CUNY faculty
Graduate Center, CUNY alumni
MacArthur Fellows
American women historians
Historians of science
Fellows of the Medieval Academy of America
21st-century American women
Members of the American Philosophical Society